Michaux is a French surname. Notable people with the surname include:

 André Michaux (1746–1802), French botanist and explorer
 Bernard Michaux (1921–1987), Luxembourgian footballer
 François André Michaux (1770–1855), French botanist
 Henri Michaux (1899–1984), Belgian-French writer
 Lewis H. Michaux (1884/5–1976), African-American activist and bookseller
 Lightfoot Solomon Michaux (1883–1969), American entrepreneur and televangelist
 Mickey Michaux, American state legislator from North Carolina
 Pierre Michaux (1813–1883), French blacksmith, inventor of pedal bicycles

See also
 Micheaux

French-language surnames
Lists of people by surname